The National League was formed in 1932 combining teams from the Northern League and Southern League. It was the fourth season of speedway in the United Kingdom.

Summary
From the teams that finished the 1931 Northern League, Leeds Lions and Preston closed down, leaving only Belle Vue Aces and Sheffield. From the 1931 Southern League, High Beech and Lea Bridge had closed Plymouth Tigers were new competitors.

In the first half of the season, the teams competed for the National Association Trophy in a league format won by Stamford Bridge Pensioners. During this phase Southampton Saints moved to Lea Bridge and rode as Clapton Saints and at the end of the phase Sheffield dropped out.

In the second half of the season Wembley Lions won the inaugural National League title. Dicky Case of the  Wimbledon Dons finished with the highest average.

Final table

Top Ten Riders

National Trophy
The 1932 National Trophy was the second edition of the Knockout Cup.

First round

Quarterfinals

Semifinals

Final

First leg

Second leg

Wembley were declared National Trophy Champions, winning on aggregate 103-87.

National Association Trophy
The National Association Trophy was won by Stamford Bridge.

Final table

See also
List of United Kingdom Speedway League Champions
Knockout Cup (speedway)

References

Speedway National League
1932 in speedway
1932 in British motorsport